Mack Swain (born Moroni Swain; February 16, 1876 – August 25, 1935) was a prolific early American film actor, who appeared in many of Mack Sennett’s comedies at Keystone Studios, including the Keystone Cops series. He also appeared in major features by Charlie Chaplin and starred in both the world's first feature length comedy and first film to feature a Movie-within-a-movie premise.

Early years

Swain was born on February 16, 1876, to Robert Henry Swain and Mary Ingeborg Jensen in Salt Lake City, Utah, and was educated in Salt Lake City's public schools. At age 6 he put on his first act called "Mack Swain's Mammoth Minstrels" in the family barn. At age 8 he stole all of his mother's sheets and linens to build his own circus tent. Eventually he ran away from home at age 15, joining a minstrel show. His mother took him home after one performance, but he persuaded her to let him continue in entertainment.

Career 
In the early 1900s, Swain had his own stock theater company, the Mack Swain Co., which performed in the western and midwestern United States. His most notable residency, was in Santa Cruz, California, where at one point he was bringing in 6,000 patrons a week to see his performances; over two-thirds the population of the city at the time. On June 24, 1907, the Mack Swain Co. had its 61st show in 50 days, breaking the record by any theater company ever appearing in Santa Cruz. That same year Swain bought the Alisky Theatre, and changed its name to Swain’s Theatre. By 1913, audience attendance had begun to dry up and with it Swain's theatrical career. Mack was initially hesitant to work in the film industry, viewing it as an "inferior art form to theater," but eventually gave in after many of his fellow actors and peers had done the same.

His first foray into silent film began at Keystone Studios under Mack Sennett. His first dressing room was shared with Roscoe "Fatty" Arbuckle. Shortly after arriving at Keystone, Charlie Chaplin too joined the studio and the two quickly teamed up. Swain would later recall that Sennett initially saw him and Chaplin as a burden, and encouraged the two to work together. These early films such as: Laughing Gas (1914) and Mabel's Married Life (1914) would forge a friendship between the two that would endure until Swain's death. Chaplin would later state that his idea for his infamous character, The Tramp, came from him rummaging through Swain's and Arbuckle's dressing room; the baggy clothes from Arbuckle and the iconic mustache from one of Swain's own fake mustaches. Swain and Chaplin would eventually star in the world's first feature length comedy, Tillie's Punctured Romance (1914). Chaplin soon left Keystone and Swain paired up with Chester Conklin to make a series of comedy films. With Swain as "Ambrose" and Conklin as the grand mustachioed "Walrus", they performed these roles in several films including The Battle of Ambrose and Walrus and Love, Speed and Thrills, both made in 1915. Another of Swain's early comedies made a cinematic first; his A Movie Star (1916) was the first film to feature a movie within a movie premise.

Besides these comedies, the two appeared together in a variety of other films, 26 all told, and they also appeared separately and/or together in films starring Mabel Normand, Charles Chaplin, Roscoe Arbuckle and most of the rest of the roster of Keystone players.

Swain later took his Ambrose character with him to the L-KO Kompany. Having already worked with Charles Chaplin at Keystone, Swain began working with Chaplin again at First National in 1921, appearing in The Idle Class, Pay Day, and The Pilgrim. He is also remembered for his large supporting role as Big Jim McKay' in the 1925 film The Gold Rush, for United Artists, written by and starring Chaplin.

Personal life
Swain was married to actress Cora King.

Death 
Swain died in Tacoma, Washington, on August 25, 1935, following an illness that only lasted a few hours.

Legacy

For his contribution to the motion picture industry, Swain received a star on the Hollywood Walk of Fame, at 1500 Vine Street.

Partial filmography

Images

References

External links
 

 

1876 births
1935 deaths
Male actors from Salt Lake City
American male film actors
American male silent film actors
Silent film comedians
Vaudeville performers
20th-century American male actors
Articles containing video clips
20th-century American comedians
Comedians from Utah
American male comedy actors